Andrea Staffolani (born 19 February 1983) is an Italian footballer who plays as a forward for Matelica.

Career

Ancona
Born in Osimo, the Province of Ancona, Marche, Staffolani started his career at Ancona.

Parma
In 2001, he was signed by Parma in co-ownership deal for 1.5 billion lire along with Paolo Guastalvino for undisclosed fee (Parma-Vicenza joint-contract). He was loaned back to Ancona for 2001–02 Serie B. In January 2002 he was signed by Taranto for the rest of 2001–02 Serie C1. In June 2002 the co-ownership was renewed but later terminated during the season. Ancona acquired Giampiero Maini in July 2002 and Daniele Degano in co-ownership deal in August 2002 from Parma for undisclosed fees. Staffolani spent another 2 seasons on loan to Serie C1 for Vis Pesaro.

Fermana
In 2004, he was transferred to Fermana. He was released in July 2006 after the bankruptcy of the club.

Ancona return
In 2006, he returned to Ancona, new ran by Ancona SpA to replace the previous folded entity. In the second half of 2007–08 Serie C1, he was loaned to Sangiovannese. That season Ancona and Sangiovannese was promoted to Serie B and relegated to 2008–09 Lega Pro Seconda Divisione respectively from Serie C1 group B. Staffolani's loan contract was expired on 30 June 2008. He returned to Ancona and was awarded no.23 shirt for the Serie B campaign. In January 2009 he was transferred to Gela of the fourth division.

Lega Pro clubs
In 2009, he joined Poggibonsi of the fourth division. He finally able to score a double figure in a season. In 2010, he moved to fellow fourth division club Giacomense. In the first season he added 5 goals into his accounts and another 14 goals in 2011–12 Lega Pro Seconda Divisione.

Amateur
In October 2012 he joined Matelica of Eccellenza Marche.

References

External links
 Serie A profile 

Italian footballers
A.C. Ancona players
Parma Calcio 1913 players
Taranto F.C. 1927 players
Vis Pesaro dal 1898 players
Fermana F.C. players
A.S.D. Sangiovannese 1927 players
S.S.D. Città di Gela players
U.S. Poggibonsi players
A.C. Giacomense players
Serie B players
Association football forwards
Sportspeople from the Province of Ancona
1983 births
Living people
Footballers from Marche